An election to Carmarthen District Council was held on 2 May 1991.  It was preceded by the 1987 election and followed, after local government reorganization, by the first election to Carmarthenshire County Council in 1995. On the same day there were elections to the other local authorities and community councils in Wales.

Overview
There were some limited changes as a result of the election, including the capture of three seats by the Labour Party in Carmarthen Town.

Results

Abergwili (one seat)

Carmarthen Town North (four seats)

Carmarthen Town South (two seats)

Carmarthen Town West (three seats)
An Independent candidate had won a seat at a by-election following the resignation of Plaid Cymru councilor Malcolm Jones.

Cenarth (one seat)

Clynderwen (one seat)

Cynwyl Elfed (one seat)

Gorslas (two seats)

Laugharne Township (one seat)

Llanboidy (one seat)

Llanddarog (one seat)

Llanddowror (one seat)

Llandyfaelog (one seats)

Llanfihangel-ar-Arth (one seat)

Llangeler (two seats)

Llangynnwr (two seats)

Llangyndeyrn (two seats)

Llanllwni (one seat)

Llansteffan(one seat)

Llanybydder (one seat)

Newchurch (one seat)

Pencarreg (one seats)

St Clears (two seats)

St Ishmael (one seat)

Trelech (one seat)

Whitland (one seat)

References

1991
1991 Welsh local elections
20th century in Carmarthenshire